Cañaveral is a town in the Contralmirante Villar Province of the Tumbes Region in northwestern Peru. It is the capital of the Casitas District and has a population of 494 (1999).

Populated places in the Tumbes Region